Oyo is a town in the Republic of Congo, located in the Cuvette Region, more than 400 km from Brazzaville and 5 km from Edou. In 2010 the town had more than 5 000 inhabitants. It is connected by paved road to Brazzaville, the capital of the country road, and Owando the north. It is served by the Oyo Ollombo Airport and a river port on the Alima River. Denis Sassou Nguesso, the current president of the Republic of Congo, as well as several members of his family and his entourage, have houses in or around Oyo.

In addition, the city of Oyo is distinguished by the presence of a 5 star luxury hotel the Pefaco Hotel Alima Palace 5* which is located on the edge of the banks of the Alima River between the city and the airport.

References 

Populated places in the Republic of the Congo
Cuvette Department